Antoine Louis Gourdon, born in Paris on 20 July 1765 and died there on 28 June 1833, was a vice-amiral of the French Navy.

Life 
He saw his first campaign in the frigate Aimable, taking part in the capture of Demerara. Unlike many officers he did not join the French Royalist cause, and was dismissed in 1793. Later restored to the Navy, he served with the Saint-Domingue expedition, commanding the naval division at Port-de-Paix.

He later took part, in April 1809, at the Battle of Basque Roads, on board Foudroyant. 
In 1811 he took command of the French squadron based in the Scheldt, defending the river from British attack during the Siege of Antwerp in 1814.

After the fall of Emperor Napoleon, he joined the Bourbon Restoration. From 1815, he successfully commanded the fleet at Rochefort, and that at Brest between 1816 and 1826. In 1822, he was promoted to vice-amiral and became a member of the conseil d'Amirauté. In 1829, he became directeur général of the Dépôt des cartes et plans de la Marine, the French naval cartography department.

He was made a Chevalier (February 1804), Officier (June 1804), Commandeur (July 1814) and Grand Officier (August 1820) of the national order of the Légion d’honneur as well as a Chevalier (July 1814), Commandeur (May 1816) and Grand Croix (August 1824) of the Ordre de Saint-Louis.

He died on 28 June 1833 and was buried in the 39th division of the Cimetière du Père-Lachaise in Paris.

Bibliography
 
 Olivier Chapuis, À la mer comme au ciel. Beautemps-Beaupré et la naissance de l'hydrographie moderne (1700-1850), Presses de l'Université Paris-Sorbonne, 1999, 1060 pages. 
 Étienne Taillemite, Dictionnaire des Marins français, Paris, Tallandier, 2002.

Notes

 This article is based on a translation of an article from the French Wikipedia.

1765 births
1833 deaths
Burials at Père Lachaise Cemetery
French Navy admirals
French naval commanders of the Napoleonic Wars
Grand Officiers of the Légion d'honneur
Grand Crosses of the Order of Saint Louis